The Cooley Society, also known as The Denton A. Cooley Surgical Society, was formed in 1972 by cardiovascular surgeons and fellows of The Texas Heart Institute, in honour of heart surgeon Denton Cooley. The founding president was Philip S. Chua.

References

Medical and health organizations based in Texas